Shraddha Walkar was a 27-year-old Indian woman who was murdered by her 28-year-old boyfriend and live-in partner Aaftab Amin Poonawala in Delhi on 18 May 2022.

Incident
The case only came to light nearly six months after the murder, when Shraddha's father lodged a missing persons complaint after learning from Shraddha's friends that they were unable to contact her for over two-and-a-half months. On 18 May 2022, 28-year-old Aaftab Poonawala strangled his live-in partner Shraddha over an argument and then proceeded to dismember her body into 35 pieces, allegedly charring her face to hide her identity. A 300-litre fridge was used to store her body parts, which were individually disposed in the Chhatarpur forest over the next 18 days, at around 2 AM every night to avoid suspicion. 

Poonawala was arrested by the Delhi Police on 12 November 2022.  Shraddha's father has demanded the death penalty for Aaftab.

Shraddha Walkar
Shraddha Walkar lived with her family until 2018, which consisted of her mother and brother in Vasai, Palghar District, Maharashtra. She studied in a convent school in Vasai and took admission in a BMM course in Viva Institute of Technology, Virar. She later dropped out from the course. Her father, Vikas Walkar, lived separately and operated an electronics service business. While working at a call centre of an MNC in Malad, Shraddha met Aaftab Amin Poonawala via the Bumble app. Aaftab is also resident of Vasai. He went to L.S. Raheja College for BMM studies. He, coincidentally, also worked at the same call centre. In 2019, she moved out to live with him, against her family's wishes, who opposed the interfaith relationship and the idea of living-in with someone "she barely knew".

Friends and family of Shraddha have further accused Poonawala of physically abusing Walkar regularly prior to the murder.

Accused
Aaftab Poonawala worked at the same MNC call center as Shraddha Walkar. He confessed to the murder after the police discovered discrepancies in his statements and recovered evidence of the murder. He was then taken to the forest to identify Shraddha's remains.

Aaftab Amin Poonawalla was charged by Delhi police for killing Shraddha Walkar and chopping her body in May 2022. The chargesheet was based on evidence and witness testimony. Police allege he strangled Shraddha and disposed of remains. Aaftab was arrested after investigation found last location in Delhi.

Reactions
The public reaction to the gruesome crime has ranged from shock to victim-blaming which went from questioning Shraddha's decision to not leave Aaftab to engaging in an interfaith relationship. 

Kaushal Kishore, the Union Minister of State for Housing and Urban Affair, said that couples who wish to live together must register in court or should have proper registration. He also added that women should stay away from such live-in relationships.

References

2022 crimes in India
May 2022 events in India
2020s in Delhi
Murder in Delhi
Indian murder victims
Criminal investigation
Crimes against women
Violence against women in India
Domestic violence in India
Incidents of violence against women